Ivar-Lykke Seidelin-Nielsen, known as Ivar Lykke for short, (March 7, 1889 in Frederiksberg, Copenhagen – January 9, 1955 in Frederiksberg, Copenhagen) was a Danish amateur football (soccer) player, who played as a defender. He played 27 games for the Denmark national football team, and competed in the 1912 Summer Olympics, winning a silver medal, as well as in the 1920 Summer Olympics.

He played his entire career for Copenhagen club KB, with whom he won several Danish football championships. He made his Danish national team debut in October 1911, and was a part of the Danish squad for the 1912 Summer Olympics. He played one game at the tournament, in which Denmark won silver medals. From June 1917, he was named Danish national team captain, and he captained the national team in 12 games. He played his last national team game at the 1920 Summer Olympics, where Denmark was eliminated in the first round by Spain.

References

External links
Danish national team profile
DatabaseOlympics profile

1889 births
1955 deaths
Danish men's footballers
Kjøbenhavns Boldklub players
Denmark international footballers
Footballers at the 1912 Summer Olympics
Footballers at the 1920 Summer Olympics
Olympic footballers of Denmark
Olympic silver medalists for Denmark
Olympic medalists in football
Medalists at the 1912 Summer Olympics
Association football defenders
Sportspeople from Frederiksberg